Chuck Weyant (April 3, 1923 – January 24, 2017) was an American racecar driver. He was born in St. Mary's, Ohio.

Until his death, Weyant was the oldest living Indianapolis 500 veteran. He died on January 24, 2017, at the age of 93.

Midget cars
Weyant came from a racing family. He started out racing against his brother and father in the early 1940s before the US joined World War II. He had his first win in 1947 after the war. Weyant won track titles at Charleston and Belleville, Illinois. The finished in the top 25 in the National points battle nine times between 1951 and 1971. He won at least 64 feature events, including 13 National events.  One of his greatest victories was the 1955 Hut Hundred at the Terre Haute Action Track.

Championship cars
Weyant raced in the AAA and USAC Championship Car series in the 1952-1959 seasons, with 21 career starts, including the 1955 and 1957-1959 Indianapolis 500 races.  He finished in the top ten 5 times, with his best finish in 8th position in 1954 at Las Vegas and in 1959 at Milwaukee.

Career awards
He was inducted in the National Midget Auto Racing Hall of Fame.

Indianapolis 500 results

World Championship career summary
The Indianapolis 500 was part of the FIA World Championship from 1950 through 1960. Drivers competing at Indy during those years were credited with World Championship points and participation. Chuck Weyant participated in 4 World Championship races but scored no World Championship points.

References

1923 births
2017 deaths
Indianapolis 500 drivers
People from St. Mary's, Ohio
Racing drivers from Ohio